Living on the Edge is the first studio album by French DJ Stéphane Pompougnac.

In Thailand, Pompougnac held a launch party for the album and Hôtel Costes, Vol. 6 on March 2, 2004 at the Si Lom Road Sofitel in Bangkok. In Canada, the album was released on August 3, 2004 by Isla Del Sol.

Track listing
 "Pour Faire le Portrait d'un Oiseau" (texte dit par Yves Montand)
 "Clumsy" (featuring Michael Stipe)
 "Double Beat"
 "Morenito" (featuring Clémentine)
 "Living on the Edge"
 "Loulou de Pomérane"
 "PNC aux Portes"
 "Fog"
 "Fast and Loud" (featuring Juliette Oz)
 "Petit Pompoupou"
 "One Soul Rising" (featuring Cathy Battistessa)
 "Closer to Julie"

Bonus track
 "Morenito" (Bossa mix)

Japan bonus tracks
 "Morenito" (Charles Schillings and Sanz remix radio edit)
 "Closer to Julie" (Dublex Inc. remix)

References

2003 debut albums